Jean-Paul "JP" Morrell (born 1978) is an American Democratic politician and public defender in New Orleans, Louisiana. He has served as an at-large member of the New Orleans City Council since January 2022.

Career 
Morrell was a member of the Louisiana State Senate for District 3 from 2008 to 2020, and briefly served in the Louisiana House of Representatives from 2006 to 2008 representing District 97 to fill the unexpired term of his father, Arthur Morrell. He was re-elected to the House in 2007 and served until 2008, before running for the State Senate. He was elected to the Senate in a special election held on December 6, 2008. He served until 2020.

In 2021, Morrell won a seat on the New Orleans City Council representing the Division 2 at-large seat. He succeed Donna Glapion. Morrell faced fellow Democrats Kristin Palmer and Jared Brossett in the November 13, 2021 election for a seat on the City Council, and was elected with an outright majority of 50.7% against Palmer's 31.7% and Brossett's 11.1%. He was sworn in on January 10, 2022.

Personal life 
His mother is Cynthia Hedge-Morrell, who served on the New Orleans City Council from 2005 to 2014.

References

1978 births
Living people
Democratic Party Louisiana state senators
Democratic Party members of the Louisiana House of Representatives
New Orleans City Council members
Politicians from New Orleans
Spring Hill College alumni
Tulane University Law School alumni
21st-century American politicians
Public defenders